See also Aston Martin V8 Vantage (disambiguation) for other models sharing this name

The Aston Martin V8 Vantage is a British grand tourer, a higher performance version of the Aston Martin V8. It was hailed at its 1977 introduction as "Britain's First Supercar" for its  top speed. Its engine was shared with the Lagonda, but it used high-performance camshafts, increased compression ratio, larger inlet valves and bigger carburettors mounted on new manifolds for increased output. Straight-line performance was the best of the day, with acceleration from 0– in 5.3 seconds, one-tenth of a second quicker than the Ferrari Daytona.

Design
The Oscar India (for 1 October, the date of introduction) version, introduced in late 1978, featured an integrated tea-tray spoiler and smoother bonnet bulge. Inside, a black leather-covered dash replaced the previous walnut. The wooden dashboard did find its way back into the Vantage during the eighties, giving a more luxurious appearance. This line was produced, with some running changes, until 1989. From 1986 the engine had .

One of the most noticeable features was the closed-off hood bulge rather than the open scoop found on the normal V8. The grille area was also closed off, with twin driving lights inserted and a spoiler added to the bootlid.

The 1986–1989 580 'X-Pack' was a further upgrade, with Cosworth pistons and Nimrod racing-type heads producing 403 hp.  A 'big bore' after-market option was also available from Works Service, with 50 mm carbs (instead of 48 mm) and straight-through exhaust system giving 432 hp (the same engine as fitted to the limited-edition V8 Zagato. 16-inch wheels were also now fitted. If this wasn't enough, a  6.3-litre version was also available from Aston Martin, and independents offered a 7-litre version.

304 Series 2 Vantage coupés were built – including 131 X-Packs – and 192 Volantes (in spite of only having been officially introduced in 1986, near the end of production). Of the 'Cosmetic' Vantage (for the US Swiss and Japanese markets, with fuel injection instead of Weber carburettors), 14 Series 2 coupés and 56 Volantes were built. Cosmetic Vantages lacked the powerful Vantage engine but retained the Vantage name and most of its body alterations – though the lack of carburettors allowed a flattened hood. From 1980 they featured DOT-approved  safety bumpers front and rear. Most of these cars have since been retrofitted with full power, European spec engines.

Although the full spec (carburettor) Vantage models were not imported into the US when new, they now qualify for entry under the DOT's 'Show and Display' rules in most US States. Federal requirements are also less strict for cars over 25 years old (as all Vantages now are).

Vantage Volante
A Vantage Volante convertible version was also produced between 1986 and 1989. Six mechanically similar cars had been built earlier to special order, but it was not regularly available until then. The production version featured an even deeper front spoiler than fitted to the Vantage, even wider wheel arches, and extended side skirts. The Vantage Volante also had a rear spoiler, which the regular Volante did not feature. In total, 166 Vantage Volantes were built, with the last ones leaving the factory in December 1989. In 1987 Charles, Prince of Wales took delivery of a Vantage Volante, but at his request without the production car's wider wheelarches, front air dam and side skirts. This became known as the 'Prince of Wales Spec' (or PoW) and around another 26 such cars were built by the factory. These are now generally considered the most desirable of all the 1970s/80s V8 models. Combined with the PoW cars, 192 Vantage Volantes were built.

The Living Daylights

James Bond's car in the 1987 film, The Living Daylights, was a V8 Volante (convertible), registration number B549 WUU, with a few optional extras installed. The car used was a Volante owned by Aston Martin Lagonda chairman Victor Gauntlett. Later, the car is fitted with a hardtop ("winterised") at Q Branch, and these scenes feature a pair of non-Vantage V8 saloons, fitted with the same number plate as the initial car, but with Vantage badges now fitted to match the previous Vantage. The number plate B549 WUU was painted on the upper portion of Pierre Gasly's Red Bull Racing RB15's rear wing for the 2019 British Grand Prix.

The alterations and gadgets featured were:

 Head-up display
 Police band radio
 Tyre spikes
 Rocket motor behind rear number plate
 Retractable outriggers
 Heat-seeking missiles behind front fog lights
 Lasers in front wheel hubcaps
 Bulletproof windows and body
 Self-destruct system

The car returns to the franchise in the film No Time to Die where James Bond drives it to return to MI6 and when he and Madeleine go to Norway to visit her childhood home as well as meeting Mathilde, her daughter. At the end of the movie, the V8 Vantage would be driven by Madeleine Swann as she takes her daughter Mathilde to Matera and tells her the story of James Bond.

In other films
In the James Bond parody Johnny English Strikes Again, Johnny English drives an Aston Martin V8 Vantage similar to the one used by James Bond, though it is coloured red, less modified, and was provided by Rowan Atkinson, who had purchased it six months before filming started.

References

External links

V8 Vantage (1977)
1970s cars
1980s cars
Cars introduced in 1977
Convertibles
Grand tourers
Coupés
Muscle cars
Cars of England